Bibiana María Landó Meyer, better known as Bibi Landó (born 11 September 1967) is an actress, businesswoman, television and radio host from Paraguay. She was a television host for newscasts as well as entertainment programs such as "El Sueño Mágico de Bibi"(version of El Show de Xuxa) which was a show for children on Channel 9. Currently she is in charge of the programs "El Doctor en Casa" on Paraguay TV, "Residentas" from Canal GEN and "Tiempo de Unión" on Radio La Unión. She comes from a well-known family in Paraguay, which includes her mother writer Marta Meyer de Landó; her brother, chef Enrique Landó, and her nephew Paul Landó, a Paraguayan YouTuber.

References

1967 births
Living people
People from Asunción
Paraguayan television presenters
Paraguayan radio presenters
Paraguayan women radio presenters
Paraguayan women television presenters
Paraguayan journalists
Paraguayan women journalists